Broken But Beautiful is a 2018 Hindi romance web series, created by Ekta Kapoor, and available on video on demand platforms and ALTBalaji/MX Player. The series revolves around love, heartbreaks and never ending romance between two individuals. First two seasons are about the story of Veer and Sameera played by Vikrant Massey and Harleen Sethi respectively. The third season introduces a new story of Agastya and Rumi played by Sidharth Shukla and Sonia Rathee respectively.

Plot

Story of Veer and Sameera

Season 1
Broken But Beautiful season 1 is Veer and Sameera's story, where their hearts were left broken. Veer lost his wife Alina in a road accident 3 years ago but still hasn't been able to cope. Veer begins to hallucinate Alina and talks to her in his imagination. Alina's sister, Ishanvi and her husband Adil are motivating him to move on in his life and try to spend time with him. Due to unavoidable circumstances, Veer has to buy his cousin Kartik's house. Kartik broke up with his girlfriend Sameera 8 months ago and moved on to date Ananya. Sameera has been unable to forget Kartik and stalks him everywhere, unable to move on. Since the house belonged to Kartik and Sameera, Veer needs Sameera's signatures on the sale papers. When she signs the papers, Veer promises her to let her speak to Kartik one last time.

Veer and Sameera come up with a plan and pretend they are together to make Kartik jealous. The show then revolves around the budding relationship between Sameera and Veer.

Season 2
Veer meets Debbie and Sameera meets Ahan. Veer and Sameera decide to marry Debbie and Ahan respectively. Then the show revolves around the realization of love for both Veer and Sameera towards each other.
As Veer and Sameera separate, Veer meets Debbie and start dating, while Sameera meets her classmate, Ahan who had a crush on her formerly. In the hope of bonding with her once again, Ahan asks Sameera out and she reluctantly agrees. They soon become great friends but Sameera's past experiences stop her from being in a relationship. Meanwhile, Veer and Sameera meet once again and become friends, deciding to move on from their past experiences. Sameera gets to know that Debbie is pregnant with Veer's child and that Veer has completely turned into the Sameera she was before and has now decided to marry Debbie. Feeling insecure, she starts seeing Ahan who is madly in love with her. Soon, Veer and Sameera talk about their feelings and become intimate in a drunken state. When they finally wake up the next morning, they realize their folly and decide to tell their respective partners. In mean time, Debbie realizes that she is not pregnant and tells it to Veer who panics and Ishanvi accidentally blurts out the truth and they break up. Sameera also tells Ahan who tells her to choose between him and the one she cheated on him with. Sameera chooses Ahan out of guilt and Ahan acts as a very supportive partner. Veer, on the other hand, confesses his love to Sameera who tells him about her former choice. Thus, they part ways yet again and this time Veer has a lot of difficulty in moving on. But fate has other plans of bringing them before each other as Sameera and Ahan decide to get married in Veer's resort. And the rest of the story revolves on how these two find their way back to each other.

Story of Agastya and Rumi

Season 3

Broken But Beautiful exhibits a determined and courageous Agastya Rao who is a struggling theatre writer-director with principles and truckloads of attitude who believes the mediocre world doesn't deserve someone as talented as him and a feisty Rumi Desai who come from a different strata of society. Rumi comes from a rich family, a spill-over of her mother's second marriage. She hates her stepsister who always manages to overshadow her. But when they meet, Agastya sees the talent and intensity in Rumi. They start an intense fling. Rumi is in love with Ishaan (Ehan Bhat) her rich and suave childhood friend and tells Agastya that they can't have a future together, but Agastya has fallen in love. He falls into a trap of drunkenness and depression and Rumi gets married. After a few years, Rumi divorces Ishaan and realises he never loved her like Agastya did.

Cast

Main

Recurring

Episodes

Series overview

Season 1 (2018)

Season 2 (2019)

Season 3 (2021)

Soundtrack

Season 1

Season 2

Season 3

References

External links
Broken But Beautiful on ALTBalaji
Broken But Beautiful 2 on ALTBalaji
Broken But Beautiful 3 on ALTBalaji
Broken But Beautiful on ZEE5 (season 2)
 

2018 web series debuts
Hindi-language web series
ALTBalaji original programming
Indian drama web series